In music, hocket is the rhythmic linear technique using the alternation of notes, pitches, or chords. In medieval practice of hocket, a single melody is shared between two (or occasionally more) voices such that alternately one voice sounds while the other rests.

History
In European music, hocket or hoquet was used primarily in vocal and choral music of the 13th and early 14th centuries. It was a predominant characteristic of music of the Notre Dame school, during the ars antiqua, in which it was found in sacred vocal music and string compositions. In the 14th century, this compositional device was most often found in secular vocal music. Although the term is in reference to this secular music of the 13th and 14th centuries in France, the technique under other names could be heard in different types of music across the world as early as the 11th century. As alternating or trading melodies between instruments had well been developed earlier in time to eventually influence the medieval usage of the technique.

The term originated in reference to medieval French motets, though the technique remains in common use in contemporary music. Examples include  Louis Andriessen's Hoketus; some popular music of the United States (funk, stereo panning, the guitar duos Robert Fripp/Adrian Belew in King Crimson, and Tom Verlaine/Richard Lloyd in Television); the Indonesian gamelan music (interlocking patterns shared between two instruments—called imbal in Java and kotekan in Bali); Andean siku music (two panpipe sets sharing the full number of pitches); Ukrainian and Russian kuvytsi (panpipe) ensembles, Lithuanian skudučiai (panpipe) ensembles, handbell music (tunes being distributed between two or more players), rara street processions in Haiti, as well as in the gaga in the Dominican Republic. Hocket is used in many African cultures such as the Ba-Benzélé (featured on Herbie Hancock's "Watermelon Man," see Pygmy music), Mbuti, Basarwa (Khoisan), the Gumuz tribe from the Blue Nile Province (Sudan), and Gogo (Tanzania). It is also evident in drum and bugle corps drumline music, colloquially known as "split parts" or simply "splits".  Segments of the trombone ensemble in Duke Ellington's "Braggin' in Brass" are a rare jazz instance of hocket.

The use of hocketing is in reference to a broken melody line between two or more instruments or vocals, many contemporary artists freely integrate hocketing techniques with other composition devices such as alternating melodies, trading multiple melodic sections, or translating them between instruments or switching intervals of melody, or composing interlocking melodies shared between instruments. Hocket technique typically implied sharing a vocal on the vowels or having a sequence of notes spliced between instruments or vocals with certain notes in the melody being the moments of exchange. Interlocking notes are not a phenomenon in music unique to hocketing, alternating melody techniques have many uses through composition such as enabling certain vocals or instruments to become more audible than others, or effectively combining into a sequential chord, or by splitting the vocals or instruments between audio sources. While hoquet is an antiquated term and in contemporary practice is usually used alongside other melodic compositional devices and experimentation, it has found use in funk, and stereo panning, among other modern techniques typically used in similar style, and in multiple track recordings is often used artificially while editing arrangements of the song.

The group Dirty Projectors have used hocketing and other antiquated techniques prominently as an element of their music, experimenting with instruments as well as vocals in the style of hocketing or melodic intervals, particularly with interlocking or alternating melodies, though not all these techniques are explicitly the "hoquet" method. The group's frontman Dave Longstreth has expressed his interest and surprise in the medieval origins of the experimental techniques in use by the band.

Etymology
The term comes from the French word hoquet (in Old French also hocquet, hoket, or ocquet) meaning "a shock, sudden interruption, hitch, hiccup," and similar onomatopeic words in Celtic, Breton, Dutch and other languages. The words were Latinized as hoquetus, (h)oketus, and (h)ochetus. Earlier etymologies tried to show derivation from Arabic, but they are no longer favored.

See also
 Bigwala, ceremonial music from Uganda
 Kecak, Balinese performance piece also known as the Ramayana Monkey Chant
 Klangfarbenmelodie
 Melodic fission

Notes

Further reading
 Tagg, Philip. "Hocket", Encyclopedia of Popular Music of the World
 Musical example from Cent Motets du XIIIe Siècle, vol. I, Paris, 1908, 64–65.
 "The Gumuz Tribe: Music of the Blue Nile Province" – Anthology of African Music (1980) – Reference D8072, Reissue (text by Robert Gottlieb)

Musical techniques
Medieval music theory